Brachydesmus superus, sometimes called the flat millipede, is a species of millipede in the family Polydesmidae. Its specific name is from the Latin word for "above, upper," because it lives in the upper soil layer.

Appearance
A light brown or grey flat-backed millipede. Accordingly, adults in this genus have two fewer legs than most polydesmid adults have: Females have only 29 pairs of legs, and males have only 28 pairs of walking legs, excluding one pair of gonopods.

Distribution
Native to Europe, also found in New England.

Behaviour
Lives in damp terrestrial habitats. Female lays about 50 eggs in spring or summer in a dome-shaped nest. The first-staged larva has seven segments and three pairs of legs; it moults six times (sometimes seven for males) before reaching adult size.

They are known as a pest in sugar beet fields.

References

Animals described in 1884
Polydesmida
Taxa named by Robert Latzel
Millipedes of Europe
Agricultural pest arthropods